Jürgen Blum (born 21 April 1956) is a German equestrian. He competed in the team eventing at the 1996 Summer Olympics.

References

External links
 

1956 births
Living people
German male equestrians
Olympic equestrians of Germany
Equestrians at the 1996 Summer Olympics
Sportspeople from Munich